This is a list of members who sat in the 19th Abgeordnetenhaus of Berlin, the state parliament of Berlin, between 2021 and 2023. These members were elected in the 26 September 2021 state election, and the Abgeordnetenhaus was constituted in its first session on 4 November 2021. Due to irregularities in the election, on 16 November 2022 the results were voided by the Berlin Constitutional Court and new elections ordered. This did not reset the legislative term, meaning the members elected in the 2023 Berlin repeat state election also sit as members of the 19th Abgeordnetenhaus.

The Abgeordnetenhaus had 147 members, 17 seats larger than its minimum size of 130. It comprised 36 members of the Social Democratic Party (SPD), 32 members of Alliance 90/The Greens (GRÜNE), 30 members of the Christian Democratic Union (CDU), 24 members of The Left (LINKE), 13 members of the Alternative for Germany (AfD), and 12 members of the Free Democratic Party (FDP).

The President of the Abgeordnetenhaus was Dennis Buchner (SPD). The Vice Presidents were Bahar Haghanipour (GRÜNE) and Cornelia Seibeld (CDU).

Presidium

Parliamentary groups

List of current members

List of former members

References

Government of Berlin
Politics of Germany
State legislatures of Germany
Members of the Abgeordnetenhaus of Berlin